The 2013 Indian Premier League spot-fixing and betting case arose when the Delhi Police arrested three cricketers, Sreesanth, Ajit Chandila and Ankeet Chavan, on the charges of alleged spot-fixing. The three represented the Rajasthan Royals in the 2013 Indian Premier League. In a separate case, Mumbai Police arrested Vindu Dara Singh, Priyank Sepany (diamond dealer) and Chennai Super Kings Team Principal Gurunath Meiyappan for alleged betting.

In July 2015, the RM Lodha Committee suspended India Cements and Jaipur IPL, owners of Chennai Super Kings and Rajasthan Royals respectively, for two years. Additionally, Sreesanth, Chandila and Chavan were cleared of all the charges after they were found not guilty by the Patiala House Courts. However, in January 2016, Chandila was given a life ban from all forms of cricket by the BCCI.

In March 2019, the Supreme Court lifted the life ban imposed by BCCI on Sreesanth.

Investigation details
Sreesanth was arrested at his friend's house, whereas Chandila and Chavan were arrested from their team hotel in Mumbai. Rajasthan Royals suspended the contracts of the three players until the investigation was complete. Delhi police have claimed that Chavan has confessed being involved in the spot fixing. The police also claimed that Chandila had tried to get other players, including Chavan, involved in the spot fixing under the direction of the bookies.

The Board of Control for Cricket in India (BCCI) suspended the players till further investigation. BCCI secretary Sanjay Jagdale, said, "The BCCI is shocked and saddened at the recent developments. The BCCI has zero tolerance to corruption. We will offer all cooperation to the Delhi police and all other authorities in their investigations in this matter. The IPL Governing Council has met and decided that the cricketers found involved will be dealt with severely." On 4 June 2013, Delhi Police said that Sreesanth, Chandila, Chavan and 23 other people arrested by them in the spot-fixing scandal were going to be charged with the provisions of Maharashtra Control of Organised Crime Act (MCOCA) since they were acting under the command of underworld dons Dawood Ibrahim and Chhota Shakeel.

Sreesanth, Ankeet Chavan and 17 other people (including 14 alleged bookies) who were arrested by the Delhi Police were released on bail on 10 June 2013 by a Delhi court due to lack of evidence to be charged under MCOCA. Ajit Chandila had not applied for bail. Bombay High Court has sought investigation progress report from Mumbai Crime Branch during the hearing of a public interest litigation filed by social-activist Ketan Tirodkar.

Delhi Police chief Neeraj Kumar said they had been taping phone calls since April 2013. He added, "Further arrests will be of bookies and no more players will be arrested."

The International Cricket Council withdrew umpire Asad Rauf from the Champions Trophy in the wake of reports that the Mumbai Police were conducting an investigation into Asad Rauf's activities in the IPL spot fixing scandal.

Arrest of bookies

Sunil Bhatia, a bookie arrested by Delhi Police, said that he was involved in fixing in Indian Cricket League and Bangladesh Premier League besides the IPL leading to speculations that the entire fixing scandal runs even deeper.

A team of Delhi Police Special Cell officers arrested Yahya Mohammad in the early hours of 24 May 2013 from the Rajiv Gandhi International Airport in Hyderabad in connection with the cricket betting.

Ahmedabad Crime Branch arrested bookie Vinod Mulchandani from the Satellite Area of Ahmedabad city on 25 May 2013. 12.8 million INR in cash, laptops and mobile phones were seized from his possession.

Vindu Dara Singh was arrested for alleged links to bookies in this spot fixing. He was later released on bail on 3 June 2013 by a Mumbai court.

Gurunath Meiyappan case

Call records of Vindu Dara Singh in connection with the betting scandal showed that he was in frequent contact with Chennai Super Kings (CSK) team principal and BCCI president N. Srinivasan's son-in-law, Gurunath Meiyappan. To investigate whether frequent calls to Meiyappan were for betting, Mumbai Police issued summons to him. On 24 May 2013, Gurunath Meiyappan was arrested on charges of betting, conspiracy and cheating after he was questioned by the Mumbai Crime Branch. After his arrest, the CSK franchise immediately disowned him. In a press statement on 24 May 2013, India Cements, which owns the CSK franchisee said: "Mr. Meiyappan is neither the owner, nor the CEO/Team Principal of the Chennai Super Kings. [He] is only one of the members (Honorary) of the management team of the Chennai Super Kings." The main reason for the immediate disowning of him was that, his arrest could lead to termination of the CSK franchise. This was because of the Clause 11.3 (c) of the Franchise Agreement, which stated 

On 26 May, BCCI announced that a three-member commission would investigate the role of Meiyappan in the spot-fixing and betting scandal. On 31 May 2013, a senior Mumbai Police official said that Meiyappanan had been found "Not Guilty" . Meiyappan was later released on bail by a Mumbai court, on 3 June 2013.

Raj Kundra case

On 5 June 2013, Rajasthan Royals team co-owner Raj Kundra was questioned by the Delhi Police for alleged involvement in illegal betting. On 6 June 2013, Delhi Police claimed that he had confessed to them of placing bets on his IPL team through a bookie who was his friend. On 7 June 2013, Rajasthan Royals team management said that Raj Kundra would be suspended and all his shares in the team taken back if the charges against him of betting were proved. Because of this, he was suspended from the IPL by the BCCI on 10 June 2013.

Supreme court observation

On 25 March 2014, the Supreme Court of India told N. Srinivasan to step down from his position on his own as BCCI president in order to ensure a fair investigation into the betting and spot-fixing charges levied against his son-in-law Gurunath Meiyappan who was team principal of Chennai Super Kings, else it would pass verdict asking him to step down. The Supreme court said it was "nauseating" that N. Srinivasan continued as BCCI chief.

Mukul Mudgal Committee

In October 2013, Supreme Court of India appointed a three-member committee headed by Justice (Retd.) Mukul Mudgal to probe allegations of betting and spot fixing in the Indian Premier League (IPL). The committee submitted its report to the Supreme Court in February 2014. The other members of the committee are Additional Solicitor General of India L Nageswara Rao and senior advocate and former cricket umpire Nilay Dutta. The former Indian Cricket Captain Sourav Ganguly has also been appointed as a part of the committee and a part of the investigating process of the committee.

Reactions

Initially, Sreesanth's father Shantakumaran Nair termed his son's arrest to be a "larger conspiracy", and blamed cricketers MS Dhoni and Harbhajan Singh for connecting his son with the scandal, but later retracted the statement.

There were reports that the Delhi and the Mumbai police were in an unfriendly competition between each other and there was a lack of coordination between them. These reports were later dismissed by Maharashtra Home minister R. R. Patil saying that the two teams were co-operating with each other to uncover the truth.

See also

 2012 Indian Premier League spot-fixing case
 Controversies involving the Indian Premier League
 Match fixing in the Bangladesh Premier League
 2017 Pakistan Super League spot-fixing scandal

References

External links
 IPL Spot-Fixing Coverage on Wisden India

2013 in Indian cricket
Spot-fixing case
Indian Premier League
Sports betting scandals